Saint Olaf's Church (Danish: Sankt Olai Kirke) is a church in Hjørring, Denmark. This small church from about 1200, dedicated to Saint Olaf and built in Romanesque style, is located on a hill in Hjørring's old town center.

The altarpiece has framework in Renaissance style, and is  probably made by Niels Ibsen, with paintings from the 18th century and "Christ and Nicodemus" from around 1910 by A. Hou.

The Renaissance pulpit was added in 1604 by Niels Ibsen.
The new baptismal font is made of sandstone. The older font is now at the Vendsyssel Historical Museum.
The church organ with 17 voices is from 1972.

References 

Hjørring
Buildings and structures in Hjørring
Churches in the North Jutland Region
Lutheran churches converted from Roman Catholicism
Churches in the diocese of Aalborg